Outbox Enterprises was founded in 2011 and based in Los Angeles. It offers a white label system to sell tickets directly to customers, allowing live entertainment venues to control their inventory, pricing, and consumer data without third party involvement. The Cirque du Soleil, a client, is also a shareholder.

History 
In 2011, Outbox and AEG created AXS, a competitor to Ticketmaster. The former Ticketmaster CEO Frederic D. Rosen became the CEO of Outbox Enterprises. After a year, Fred Rosen had to step down, which suggests a sign of internal troubles at Outbox. Outbox Enterprises was born from Outbox Technology, founded in 2005 by Jean-Francoys Brousseau.

In 2015, it changed its name to OutboxAXS, indicating a clash of visions between Outbox and AEG. In 2019, Outbox sold its stake in AXS to AEG. In 2015, OutboxAXS also merged with the paperless ticketing system Veritix.

In 2020, the Cirque du Soleil, a major shareholder of Outbox, went bankrupt.

References 

Ticket sales companies